H. acaulis may refer to:
 Helvella acaulis, a plant pathogen species
 Hesperevax acaulis, a daisy species
 Hymenoxys acaulis, a rubberweed species in the genus Hymenoxys